John Gemmell Currie (born 7 April 1939) is a Scottish footballer who played as a wing half in the Football League for Workington and Chester.

References

1939 births
Living people
Footballers from Dumfries
Association football wing halves
Scottish footballers
Leicester City F.C. players
Workington A.F.C. players
Chester City F.C. players
Rhyl F.C. players
English Football League players